Carlos Agustín Fonseca Teijeiro (born 8 March 1981) is a Spanish football manager.

Career
Fonseca was born in Madrid, and started his career with EF Arganda's Cadete squad in 2012. Ahead of the 2014–15 season, he was appointed manager of the Juvenil squad, and managed the side for two years before joining Getafe CF.

On 26 June 2019, Fonseca was presented as manager of Tercera División side CD La Granja. On 27 October, after only winning six out of 36 possible points and a 0–6 loss to Zamora CF, he was sacked.

In August 2020, Fonseca moved abroad and joined Al-Tai in Saudi Arabia, being in charge of the under-23 side. On 9 February 2021, he replaced compatriot Alex Pallarés at the helm of Bolivian side Real Potosí.

Fonseca was sacked by Potosí on 13 May 2021, with his club in the penultimate position. On 30 November 2022, he was presented by the Royal Madrid Football Federation as their new head coach of the under-16 category.

Personal life
In 2018, Fonseca published a book called ¿Hablamos de fútbol? (Do we talk about football? in English).

References

External links
 

1981 births
Living people
Sportspeople from Madrid
Spanish football managers
Tercera División managers
Bolivian Primera División managers
Club Real Potosí managers
Spanish expatriate football managers
Spanish expatriate sportspeople in Saudi Arabia
Spanish expatriate sportspeople in Bolivia
Expatriate football managers in Saudi Arabia
Expatriate football managers in Bolivia